Volodymyr Ovsienko (born 30 October 1978) is a Ukrainian football player.

References
Profile at HLSZ.
Profile  at MLSZ.

External links
Profile at FFU website
Interview by Obolon correspondents. 1 April 2008
Profile at allplayers.in.ua

1978 births
Living people
Sportspeople from Uzhhorod
Ukrainian footballers
Association football goalkeepers
FC Hoverla Uzhhorod players
FC CSKA Kyiv players
FC Arsenal Kyiv players
FC Polissya Zhytomyr players
FC Metalist Kharkiv players
FC Oleksandriya players
FC Obolon-Brovar Kyiv players
FC Naftovyk-Ukrnafta Okhtyrka players
Nyíregyháza Spartacus FC players
Ukrainian Premier League players
Nemzeti Bajnokság I players
Ukrainian expatriate footballers
Expatriate footballers in Hungary
Ukrainian expatriate sportspeople in Hungary